Rusydina Antardayu Riodingin (born 7 July 1993) is an Indonesian-born Malaysian badminton player.

Personal life 
Riodingin married to Malaysian badminton player Mohamad Arif Abdul Latif on 14 September 2019.

Achievements

BWF International Challenge/Series (1 title) 
Mixed doubles

  BWF International Challenge tournament
  BWF International Series tournament
  BWF Future Series tournament

BWF Junior International (1 title, 1 runner-up) 
Girls' singles

  BWF Junior International Grand Prix tournament
  BWF Junior International Challenge tournament
  BWF Junior International Series tournament
  BWF Junior Future Series tournament

Performance timeline

Individual competitions

Junior level  
 Girls' singles

Senior level

Women's singles

Women's doubles

Mixed doubles

References

External links 
 

1993 births
Living people
People from Tangerang
Sportspeople from Banten
Indonesian female badminton players
20th-century Indonesian women
21st-century Indonesian women